A lagniappe a small gift given to a customer by a merchant at the time of a purchase.

Langniappe may also refer to:
Lagniappe (newspaper), an alternative newspaper in Mobile, Alabama
Lagniappe (album), a Hurricane Katrina benefit album by Saddle Creek records
Procambarus lagniappe, a species of crayfish
Lagniappe (yearbook), the student yearbook at Louisiana Tech
"Lagniappe", a song by Michelle Shocked from the 2003 re-release of The Texas Campfire Tapes
"Lagniappe for piano", a 1985 composition by Milton Babbitt
Lagniappe Dulcimer Fete, an annual festival in Port Allen, Louisiana